USS SP-847 was a United States Navy patrol vessel in commission from 1917 to 1919.

SP-912 was built as the private motorboat Dorothea II in 1916 by the Smith & Williams Company at Salisbury, Maryland. In May 1917, the U.S. Navy acquired her from her owner for use as a section patrol vessel during World War I, but did not order her delivered until 27 October 1917. She was commissioned as USS SP-912 on 7 December 1917.

SP-912 performed patrol duties for the rest of World War I. Stricken from the Navy List in early March 1919, she was reported returned to her owner on 4 April 1919.

References
Department of the Navy Naval History and Heritage Command Online Library of Selected Images: Civilian Ships: Dorothea II (American Motor Boat, 1916). Served as USS SP-912 in 1917-1919
NavSource Online: Section Patrol Craft Photo Archive SP 912

Patrol vessels of the United States Navy
World War I patrol vessels of the United States
Ships built in Salisbury, Maryland
1916 ships